Napoleonka, colloquially kremówka, is a Polish type of cream pie. It is made of two layers of puff pastry, filled with whipped cream, creamy buttercream, vanilla pastry cream (custard cream) or sometimes egg white cream, and is usually sprinkled with powdered sugar. It also can be decorated with cream or covered with a layer of icing.

This Polish "war" between names  and  has been subject to a satirical drawing by the Polish illustrator Andrzej Mleczko.

The cake itself is a variation of mille-feuille – a French dessert made of three layers of puff pastry filled with cream or jam – also known as the Napoleon.

Sometimes kremówkas containing alcohol are sold, those became popular particularly in the aftermath of a false story that Pope John Paul II was fond of that variant. In fact, the Pope was fond of the traditional kremówka.

Papal cream pie
On 16 June 1999 pope John Paul II mentioned that after he had completed his matura exam, he had kremówkas with his colleagues in his home town of Wadowice. They wagered who could eat more. The future Pope ate eighteen kremówkas but did not win the bet.

This was publicized by media, and "papal" kremówkas from Wadowice became popular in Poland. 
The confectionery shop where the Pope ate kremówkas was owned by Jewish cake maker Karol Hagenhuber, who came to Poland from Vienna. It was located in Wadowice Town Square. Some speculated that the original papal kremówkas contained alcohol, but this was denied by Hagenhuber's son. According to him his father's cakes were regular, non-alcoholic kremówkas, although made with all natural ingredients, using a traditional recipe. Either way this led to renewed, and even international fame for the cake, rebranded as "papal".

In 2007, to celebrate Pope John Paul's II 87th birthday, a giant kremówka was baked in Rzeszów.

Kremówkas remembered by Pope John Paul II were filled with vanilla milk pudding (custard) cream.

See also
 Kremna rezina (kremšnita)
 Tompoes (tompouce)
 List of custard desserts
 List of desserts
 List of Polish desserts

References

Custard desserts
Polish desserts
Puff pastry